The Federalist Party (Partito Federalista) was a federalist Italian political party.

It was founded as Federalist Union (Unione Federalista) on 1 June 1994 by Gianfranco Miglio, an influent Senator and political scientist who left the Northern League in May over disagreements with Umberto Bossi, and Umberto Giovine, an ex-Socialist who was at the time member of Forza Italia. In July 1995 the group was strengthened by the joining of eleven deputies: all former members of Lega Nord, who had previously joined the Federalist Italian League and the Federalists and Liberal Democrats. This made possible the establishment of a sub-group within the Mixed Group in the Chamber.

The Federalist Party was officially founded on 17 December 1995. At the founding congress in Milan also Vittorio Sgarbi, art critic and maverick politician, joined the party. The program of the party included the idea of transforming Italy in a federal state, modelled onto the examples of Switzerland and the United States, composed by three cantons (Padania, Etruria and Mediterranea) and the five existing autonomous regions. The federation would have been presided by a strong President.

For the 1996 general election Sgarbi left Miglio to form a list with Marco Pannella, the Pannella-Sgarbi List. Miglio was elected Senator in his single-seat constituency in Como with the support of the Pole of Freedoms as Umberto Giovine, the party's secretary, did in Lodi. In 1997 the Federalist Party formed joint lists with the Union of the Centre at the local level and continued its approachment with Forza Italia.

The party was almost disbanded after the death of Miglio in 2001, but continued to exist and to be active as Federalist Movement (Movimento Federalista) under the leadership of Giovine until 2008, when it was merged into the Movement for Autonomy.

Leadership
President: Gianfranco Miglio (1994–2001)
Vice President: Vittorio Sgarbi (1995–1996)
Secretary: Umberto Giovine (1994–2008)

References

Political parties disestablished in 2008
Defunct political parties in Italy
Regionalist parties in Italy
Political parties established in 1994
1994 establishments in Italy
2008 disestablishments in Italy